Bora Hun Paçun (born May 27, 1987) is a Turkish professional basketball player who last played for Merkezefendi Bld. Denizli Basket of the TBL. He is 6 ft 10.75 in (2.10 m) tall center.

Pro career
He started his pro-career with Turborg Pilsener in Turkish Basketball League 2005-06 season and played with them for a year till his transfer to Efes Pilsen. He played with Efes Pilsen between 2006-09 then also played with Darüşşafaka for 2009-10 season, with Banvit for 2010-11 season and with Antalya BB for 2011-12 season. In the summer of 2012, he signed a contract with Pınar Karşıyaka.

On December 28, 2018 he has signed with Sakarya BB of the Turkish Basketball Super League.

Awards and accomplishments

Turkish national team 
 2005 FIBA Europe Under-18 Championship:

References

External links
 TBLStat.net Profile

1987 births
Living people
Anadolu Efes S.K. players
Antalya Büyükşehir Belediyesi players
Bandırma B.İ.K. players
Centers (basketball)
Darüşşafaka Basketbol players
İstanbul Büyükşehir Belediyespor basketball players
Karşıyaka basketball players
KK Rabotnički players
Merkezefendi Belediyesi Denizli Basket players
Petkim Spor players
Sportspeople from İzmir
Tuborg Pilsener basketball players
Turkish men's basketball players
Yeşilgiresun Belediye players